Sita Murmu alias Sita Soren is an Indian politician and a leader of Jharkhand Mukti Morcha serving as a member of Jharkhand Legislative Assembly from Jama. She is daughter-in-law of JMM chief Shibu Soren and wife of late Durga Soren. She was accused of receiving money in voting in 2012 Rajya Sabha election and was in jail for seven months. She is now out on bail.

References

Women in Jharkhand politics
Jharkhand Mukti Morcha politicians
Jharkhand MLAs 2014–2019
Jharkhand MLAs 2009–2014
Jharkhand MLAs 2019–2024
Living people
Members of the Jharkhand Legislative Assembly
21st-century Indian women politicians
21st-century Indian politicians
Year of birth missing (living people)